Alberton is a town in Mineral County, Montana, United States. The population was 452 at the 2020 census. Alberton was the location of a major chlorine chemical release in 1996. Alberton is the home of Northwest Indian Bible School, a Bible-training institution founded and operated by the Allegheny Wesleyan Methodist Connection (Original Allegheny Conference).

History
A post office called Alberton has been in operation since 1909. The town was named for Albert J. Earling, president of the Chicago, Milwaukee, St. Paul and Pacific Railroad.

On April 11, 1996, a Montana Rail Link train carrying chlorine derailed near Alberton.
Three hundred fifty people were injured by chlorine inhalation. One thousand people were evacuated from Alberton and from Frenchtown. Interstate 90 was shut down for nineteen days. The incident has been described as "the largest chemical spill from a train in United States history."

Geography
Alberton is located at  (47.003546, -114.477977). It is on Interstate 90 at exit 75. The Clark Fork River is to the south.

Demographics

2010 census
As of the census of 2010, there were 420 people, 190 households, and 113 families residing in the town. The racial makeup of the town was 96.0% White, 1.0% African American, 0.7% Native American, 0.2% from other races, and 2.1% from two or more races. Hispanic or Latino of any race were 1.9% of the population.

There were 190 households, of which 26.3% had children under the age of 18 living with them, 46.3% were married couples living together, 9.5% had a female householder with no husband present, 3.7% had a male householder with no wife present, and 40.5% were non-families. 33.2% of all households were made up of individuals, and 15.7% had someone living alone who was 65 years of age or older. The average household size was 2.21 and the average family size was 2.81.

The median age in the town was 43.3 years. 19% of residents were under the age of 18; 7.7% were between the ages of 18 and 24; 25.8% were from 25 to 44; 30.1% were from 45 to 64; and 17.6% were 65 years of age or older. The gender makeup of the town was 53.1% male and 46.9% female.

2000 census
As of the census of 2000, there were 374 people, 152 households, and 108 families residing in the town. The population density was 652.7 people per square mile (253.3/km²). There were 175 housing units at an average density of 305.4 per square mile (118.5/km²). The racial makeup of the town was 97.59% White, 0.27% African American, 1.07% Native American, 0.27% from other races, and 0.80% from two or more races. Hispanic or Latino of any race were 0.53% of the population.

There were 152 households, out of which 35.5% had children under the age of 18 living with them, 60.5% were married couples living together, 6.6% had a female householder with no husband present, and 28.3% were non-families. 23.7% of all households were made up of individuals, and 3.9% had someone living alone who was 65 years of age or older. The average household size was 2.46 and the average family size was 2.88.

In the town, the population was spread out, with 27.0% under the age of 18, 5.9% from 18 to 24, 32.1% from 25 to 44, 26.7% from 45 to 64, and 8.3% who were 65 years of age or older. The median age was 36 years. For every 100 females there were 96.8 males. For every 100 females age 18 and over, there were 103.7 males.

The median income for a household in the town was $26,000, and the median income for a family was $26,500. Males had a median income of $24,792 versus $20,000 for females. The per capita income for the town was $13,120. About 19.6% of families and 19.6% of the population were below the poverty line, including 25.2% of those under age 18 and 3.7% of those age 65 or over.

Climate
Alberton has a cool-summer humid continental climate (Köppen Dfb).

Education

Alberton School began as a wooden, one room school house in the early 1900s. In 1916, a fire burned down the original school. In 1920, a new brick building was built; this later became the elementary school building. The brick building is listed on the National Register of Historic Places. The current high school building is 50 feet from the elementary building and is roughly octagonal in shape. Both buildings have two stories and are connected by a tunnel. The school's mascot is the Panthers and they have football, volleyball, boys and girls basketball and track and field on campus. The school also participates in wrestling, tennis and golf as part of cooperatives with other schools in the area. The school transferred from eight-man to six-man football in 2010.

A branch of the Mineral County Public Library is in Alberton.

Arts and culture
The town celebrates its railroad heritage each year with "Alberton's Railroad Day", held the third Saturday in July. July 18, 2015 marked the 30th anniversary of this community event. There is a home-town parade, petting zoo, railroad car tour, wool spinning circle, western melodrama, family games like Hunt for the Golden Spike and music from local artists. Vendors showcase their artistic talents using local rocks, minerals, and other wildcrafting materials. Educational activities are sponsored by the Alberton Community Foundation).

See also

 List of municipalities in Montana

References

External links

Towns in Mineral County, Montana